Triadin, also known as TRDN, is a human gene associated with the release of calcium ions from the sarcoplasmic reticulum triggering muscular contraction through calcium-induced calcium release. Triadin is a multiprotein family, arising from different processing of the TRDN gene on chromosome 6. It is a transmembrane protein on the sarcoplasmic reticulum due to a well defined hydrophobic section and it forms a quaternary complex with the cardiac ryanodine receptor (RYR2), calsequestrin (CASQ2) and junctin proteins. The luminal (inner compartment of the sarcoplasmic reticulum) section of Triadin has areas of highly charged amino acid residues that act as luminal Ca2+ receptors. Triadin is also able to sense luminal Ca2+ concentrations by mediating interactions between RYR2 and CASQ2. Triadin has several different forms; Trisk 95 and Trisk 51, which are expressed in skeletal muscle, and Trisk 32 (CT1), which is mainly expressed in cardiac muscle.

Interactions
TRDN has been shown to interact with RYR1.

Triadin is required to physically link the RYR2 and CASQ2 proteins, so that RYR2 channel activity can be regulated by CASQ2. The linkage of RYR2 with CASQ2 occurs via highly charged luminal sections of Triadin that are characterized as alternating positively and negatively charged amino acids, known as the KEKE motif.

Luminal concentration levels of Ca2+ are sensed by CSQ, and this information is transmitted to RyR via Triadin. At low luminal Ca2+ concentrations, Triadin is bound to both RYR2 and CASQ2, so that CSQ prevents RYR2 from opening. At high luminal Ca2+ concentrations, Ca2+ binding sites on CASQ2 become occupied with Ca2+, leading to a weakened interaction between CASQ2 and Triadin. This removes CASQ2’s ability to have an inhibitory effect on the RYR2 channel activity. As more Ca2+ binding sites on CASQ2 become occupied, there is an increasing probability of the RYR2 channel being able to open. Eventually, CASQ2 completely dissociates from Triadin and the RYR2 channel becomes completely uninhibited, although Triadin remains bound to RYR2 at all luminal concentrations of Ca2+.

Relation to catecholaminergic polymorphic ventricular tachycardia
Most mutations that result in CPVT are found in RYR2 or CASQ2 genes, however a third of CPVT patients have no mutations in either of these proteins, making a mutation in Triadin the most likely cause Because Triadin is necessary in the regulation of Ca2+ release by the RyR channel during cardiac contraction, a mutation that prevents Triadin from being formed will make CASQ2 unable to inhibit the RYR2 channel activity, allowing Ca2+ leaks and the development of CPVT.

A deletion of amino acids in the TRDN gene can result in an early stop codon. A premature stop codon can either prevent the gene from being translated into the Triadin protein, or can result in a shortened, nonfunctional Triadin protein. A replacement of the amino acid Arginine for the amino acid Threonine at position 59 of the TRDN gene (pT59R) causes instability of Triadin, leading to degradation of the protein. Any of these naturally occurring mutations result in an absence of functional Triadin protein, resulting in CPVT in patients.

References

Further reading

External links